Nickelodeon Land is the current children's park in Blackpool Pleasure Beach, England. It opened on May 4, 2011 and is in the place of Beaver Creek which closed on September 5, 2010 after Amanda Thompson announced that the Pleasure Beach would be working with Nickelodeon to open a new and modern children's theme park.

Rides

See also
 Nickelodeon in amusement parks
 2011 in amusement parks

References

Blackpool Pleasure Beach
Amusement rides introduced in 2011